Platinum bromide can refer to:

Platinum(II) bromide, PtBr2
Platinum(IV) bromide, PtBr4